Aa calceata is a species of orchid in the genus Aa.

It can be publicly located at the countries Bolivia and Peru.

References

calceata
Plants described in 1912
Flora of Peru
Flora of Bolivia